Robat-e Khan (also Romanized as Robāţ-e Khān and Robāt Khān; also known as Ribāt-i-Khān) is a village in Montazeriyeh Rural District, in the Central District of Tabas County, South Khorasan Province, Iran. At the 2006 census, its population was 80, in 27 families.

References 

Populated places in Tabas County